Sihem Badi is a Tunisian politician. She served as the Minister of Women's Affairs under Prime Minister Hamadi Jebali.

Early life
Sihem Badi was born on June 12, 1967 in Tozeur. She received a PhD in Medical Studies from the University of Paris.

Career
, she was a member of the Congress for the Republic political party. In 1992, she was sentenced to two years in prison after she condemned former President Zine El Abidine Ben Ali, and she went to France in exile.

On December 20, 2011, she joined the Jebali Cabinet as Minister of Women's Affairs. She has said she would like to see more women in leadership positions.

On 25 March 2013, protesters congregated to demand Badi's resignation after she blamed a nursery caretaker's rape of a three-year-old girl on the girl's family.

References

Living people
1967 births
Government ministers of Tunisia
Women government ministers of Tunisia
Women's ministers of Tunisia
21st-century Tunisian women politicians
21st-century Tunisian politicians
People from Tozeur
University of Paris alumni